Sikuai is an island in the sub-district of Bungus Teluk Kabung, City of Padang, West Sumatra Province, Indonesia.

The island is located about a half mile from the center of Padang and can be achieved using marine transportation such as ships, approximately 35 minutes from port of Muara Padang.

External links

  Best destinations of 2010

Landforms of West Sumatra
Islands of Indonesia
Uninhabited islands of Indonesia